Miss Grand Nepal 2016 was the first edition of the Miss Grand Nepal beauty pageant, held on August 23, 2016, at the Hyatt Regency Hotel in Kathmandu, organized by Mero Looks and Revolution Pvt. Ltd. Ten national aspirants competed for the title, of whom a 24-year-old Mass communication student from Kathmandu, Zeenus Lama, was named the winner, and received रु50,000 Rupee cash as the prize while the first and second runners-up, Pooja Shrestha of Lalitpur and Jyotsana Maharjan of Bharatpur, obtained रु25,000 and रु10,000 Rupee, respectively.

Zeenus Lama was supposed to represent Nepal at the international contest, Miss Grand International 2016, on October 25 in Las Vegas, Nevada, but was not sent to compete due to the conflict with the national organizer, and her visa was rejected, which caused the organizer to relinquish the license. However, she was later invited by the international organizer, Miss Grand International, to participate in the  pageant in Vietnam instead, but she went unplaced.

Background
On January 5, 2016, a press conference was organized at Trisara restaurant in Kathmandu, wherein the organizers, Mero Looks, shared the details related to the Miss Grand Nepal 2016 contest. The team for Miss Grand Nepal includes Asmita Sitoula—the choreographer; Shivangi Lama—the designer; Akanshya Gurung— the makeup artist; and Milan Lama—the photographer. 

Auditions were conducted in different cities—Kathmandu, Bharatpur, Butwal, Pokhara, and Itahari—to select the contestants, while an online application was officially opened from January 29 to February 5. Of all applicants, only 10 candidates qualified for the national contest in Kathmandu.

Result

Color keys

Sub-Titles

Contestants

References

External links

 

Miss Grand Nepal
Grand Nepal